Rafael Primorac (born 11 May 1954) is a Croatian film producer, who lives and works in the United States. He studied film at the Academy of Dramatic Art, University of Zagreb, Croatia. Primorac entered the world of film production in 1975 as a PA in Cross of Iron, directed by the legendary Sam Peckinpah, starring James Coburn. He, later, worked for Jadran Film in Zagreb as a Location Manager, First AD, Production Manager, Line Producer and Head of International Co-productions. Primorac moved to Los Angeles in 1986 and worked in production and distribution. He produced Quicksand starring Michael Dudikoff and Giallo starring Adrien Brody. With his company Arramis Films, he produced Ultimate Force starring Mirko Filipović, Game of Death starring Wesley Snipes, Mysteria starring Billy Zane, Danny Glover and Martin Landau, as well as Perfect Weapon with Steven Seagal, Kill 'Em All with Jean-Claude Van Damme, and Seized with Scott Adkins.

Filmography

References

External links

1954 births
Croatian film producers
Academy of Dramatic Art, University of Zagreb alumni
Living people
Croatian emigrants to the United States
People from Vrgorac